Granulovacuolar degeneration refers to the occurrence within neurons of abnormal, fluid-filled bubbles (vacuoles) containing a dense proteinaceous granule. Granulovacuoles occur most commonly in pyramidal neurons of the hippocampus. They are present in small numbers in non-demented elderly people, but increase in frequency in Alzheimer's disease and other tauopathies. In Alzheimer's disease, granulovacuoles proliferate stage-wise in different brain areas, and their prevalence is correlated with the degree of tauopathy, Abeta plaque pathology, and cerebral amyloid angiopathy. Immunohistochemical analyses have found that the inner granule includes several proteins, including tubulin tau protein, TDP-43 and others. Although granulovacuoles and their functional significance are still poorly understood, they have been compared to autophagic vacuoles

References 

Ageing
Neuropathology
Alzheimer's disease